is a Japanese manga series written and illustrated by Nao Iwamoto. It was serialized in Shogakukan's Flowers magazine from October 2014 to April 2016, with its chapters collected into a single tankōbon volume. An anime film adaptation by Madhouse premiered in Japan in January 2023.

Characters

Media

Manga
The series was collected into a single tankōbon volume, published by Shogakukan on July 8, 2016.

The manga is licensed by Seven Seas Entertainment for English publication.

Film
An anime film adaptation was announced on June 23, 2022. It will be produced by Madhouse and directed by Kotono Watanabe, with Fumi Tsubota writing the scripts and Evan Call composing the music. The film was released in Japanese theaters on January 27, 2023. The world premiere was held at Animation Is Film Festival in Los Angeles on October 21, 2022. Kotone will perform the film's theme song "Brand New World".

Reception
In 2016, Kingdom of Gold, Kingdom of Water ranked 33rd in Da Vinci magazine's "Book of the Year" list, and it ranked third in "The Best Manga 2017 Kono Manga o Yome!" list of Freestyle magazine. In 2017, the series topped Takarajimasha's Kono Manga ga Sugoi! list of best manga for female readers. In the same year, the series was nominated for the 10th Manga Taishō, and ranked second out of 13 nominees.

References

External links
  
  
 

Fantasy anime and manga
Josei manga
Madhouse (company)
Nippon TV films
Manga adapted into films
Romance anime and manga
Seven Seas Entertainment titles
Shogakukan manga
Warner Bros. animated films
Warner Bros. films